Chembakassery Mathai Stephen (23 December 1918 – 16 January 1984) was an Indian politician who served as the Union Minister of Communications of India from 1980 to 1982 in the Republic of India. 
C. M. Stephen was born on 23 December 1918 to Eapen Mathai and Esther of Chembakassery house in Cherukole, Mavelikkara. During his school days, Stephen was active in the Balajanasakhyam (promoted by Malayala Manorama). This helped him to develop leadership qualities, oratorial and organizing skills.

Career 
After completing B. L., Stephen started his career as a journalist. He also started 'Pouraprabha' an evening daily. Through this daily, he supported the Travancore Congress and attacked the rule of C. P. Ramaswamy Iyer. In 1949, he gave up his career as a journalist and started practising law. In 1951, he joined active politics and in the same year became the D.C.C. president of Kollam.

He was a close associate of veteran Congress leaders P. T. Chacko, Pattom Thanu Pillai and R. Sankar and provided leadership in the Vimochana Samaram during 1958-59 period as an associate of P. T. Chacko, Pattom Thanu Pillai, R. Sankar and others.

He was also one of the founding fathers  of Indian National Trade Union Congress, the trade union wing of the Indian National Congress. He won the State elections in 1960, 1965 and 1971. He was also elected as a Member of Parliament from Idukki in the 1976 parliamentary elections. He was a close aide of then Prime Minister Indira Gandhi. He was the leader of the Congress Parliamentary Party - Indira faction during 1978–79.

C. M. Stephen also served in the Union Cabinet under Indira Gandhi, most notably as the Union Minister for Communications (1980–84). Shashi Tharoor in his 'India: From Midnight to the Millennium' quotes Stephen's statement in Parliament that "the telephone was a luxury and not a necessity" as symptomatic of India's failure to invest in infrastructure and communications before the Reforms of 1991.

Dharam Singh gave up the Gulbarga Lok Sabha seat to accommodate C. M. Stephen, the then Union Home Minister in the Indira Gandhi Cabinet, after he lost the election in Delhi to Atal Bihari Vajpayee.

C. M. Stephen was buried at St. Mary Orthodox Cathedral, Mavelikkara.

References
C.M.Steefan biography name of " Vangmayam" Malayalam language published by Stihti publication.kollam dist.kerala.in 2018. Authors 'V.T.Kureepuzha' and 'Anvar Sait'.

External links
Important personalities influenced me
Ham Radio demonstration given to Mr C.M Stephen in 1983 which contributed to  the first Microwave tower at Idukki , Kerala in 1983 

Malayali politicians
People from Alappuzha district
Saint Thomas Christians
1918 births
1984 deaths
Leaders of the Opposition (India)
Indian National Congress politicians from Kerala
India MPs 1971–1977
India MPs 1977–1979
India MPs 1980–1984
Lok Sabha members from Kerala
Lok Sabha members from Karnataka
Kerala MLAs 1960–1964